The Trinidad and Tobago football champions are the winners of the highest league in Trinidad and Tobago football, which is currently the TT Pro League. Teams in bold are those who won the double of the Pro League championship and FA Trophy, or the continental double of the league championship and CONCACAF Champions League in that season. Teams in italics are those who won the treble of the league championship, FA Trophy, and Champions League.

Defence Force has 22 league championships, which is the record for most titles won. Defence Force dominated the National League and Semi-Professional League during the 1970s, 1980s, and 1990s. Maple Club of Port of Spain are currently second; their 13 titles beginning in 1927 and the last in 1969, all from the Port of Spain Football League. Casuals, who have ten, won three of the first six seasons in the Port of Spain Football League. Defence Force remains the only club to win the league championship for seven consecutive seasons from 1972–1978.

There have been 13 teams that have completed the double, which are: Defence Force (5 times), Everton (3), ASL Sports Club (2), Maple Club (2), Trintoc (2), W Connection (2), Casuals, Colts, Joe Public, Paragon, Police, Regiment, and Shamrock. Defence Force remains the only Trinidadian club to have completed the treble in 1985.

Port of Spain Football League (1908–1973)

National League (1974–1995)

NOTE: In seasons 1981, 1982 and 1983, rival leagues were in operation. It was agreed that the top five clubs from each league plus the national under-21 squad would form an 11 team united league for 1984.
ASL Sports won the league, but refused to enter the play-offs which had been hastily added to the schedule near the end of the regular season. Stripped of their league crown, ASL Sports withdrew from the national league. Four national league clubs (ECM Motown, Tacarigua United, HAS Cocorite United and KFC Memphis) and three other clubs followed suit to form an eight team rival league for the 1985-season.

Semi-Professional League (1996–1998)

TT Pro League (1999–present)

Total titles won
Twenty-four clubs have been crowned champions in the highest division of Trinidad and Tobago football.
Clubs in bold compete in the TT Pro League as of the 2015–16 season.

Multiple trophy wins
See The Double and The Treble

See also
Trinidad and Tobago football league system
Association football in Trinidad and Tobago
List of TT Pro League seasons

References
General

Specific

External links
Trinidad and Tobago Football History

Trinidad and Tobago
Champions
Champions